MdN (Macintosh designers Network) is a general information magazine for graphics and design. Despite its name, the magazine's emphasis is primarily on design and secondarily about Macintosh computing.

Founded in 1989 by Yuichi Inomata, the magazine was based on a Macintosh DTP support organisation. MdN also publishes other design magazines and mooks such as web creators and effects. The magazine is published by Impress Group company.

References

External links
 Official website

1989 establishments in Japan
Computer magazines
Design magazines
Monthly magazines published in Japan
Macintosh magazines
Magazines established in 1989